CETME is a Spanish government design and development establishment. While being involved in many projects CETME was mostly known for its small arms research and development.

The CETME Model 58 and CETME Model L are its most notable projects. CETME also designed the CETME C2 9mm submachine gun, and the CETME Ameli light machine gun in 5.56×45mm NATO.

Products
 7.62×51mm CETME ammunition
 CETME Ameli
 CETME C2
 CETME Model 58
 CETME Model L

Sources
 Manual del soldado de Infantería de Marina ( 1985 ). Marine Corps soldier Manual Edited by the Spanish Ministry of Defence.
 Manual de instrucción básica de la Escuela Técnica de Seguridad y Defensa del Aire (ETESDA) (2002). Basic instruction Manual of the Technical School Safety and Air Defence (ETESDA) (2002). Edited by the Spanish Ministry of Defence.
 Centro de Documentación y Publicaciones del Ministerio de Defensa. Publications and Documentation Centre of the Ministry of Defence.
 CETME: 50 años del fusil de asalto español . (CETME: 50 years of Spanish assault rifle). José María Manrique García and Lucas Molina Franco. Edit. La Esfera de los Libros. (The Sphere of Books). .

See also
 List of battle rifles

 
Defunct manufacturing companies of Spain
Defunct firearms manufacturers
1949 establishments in Spain
Manufacturing companies established in 1949